Marco Beltrami (born October 7, 1966) is an American composer and conductor of film and television scores. He has worked in a number of genres, including horror (Scream, Mimic, The Faculty, Resident Evil, The Woman in Black, A Quiet Place), action (Terminator 3: Rise of the Machines, Live Free or Die Hard, World War Z), science-fiction (I, Robot, Snowpiercer), Western (3:10 to Yuma, Jonah Hex, The Homesman), and superhero (Hellboy, The Wolverine, Logan).

A long-time collaborator of Wes Craven, Beltrami scored seven of the director's films including the original four Craven-directed films in the Scream franchise (1996–2011). He has also worked with such directors as James Mangold, Guillermo del Toro, Tommy Lee Jones, Alex Proyas, Ole Bornedal, Kathryn Bigelow, Bong Joon-ho, Dan Gilroy, and John Krasinski. He has been nominated for two Academy Awards for 3:10 to Yuma (2007) and The Hurt Locker (2008), and a Golden Globe Award for A Quiet Place (2018). He won a Satellite Award for Soul Surfer (2011) and an Emmy Award for Free Solo (2018).

Early life
Beltrami was born on Long Island, New York, of Italian and Greek descent. He attended Ward Melville High School, and afterwards, graduated from Brown University and studied at the Yale School of Music, and then moved west to the USC Thornton School of Music in Los Angeles, where he studied under composer Jerry Goldsmith.

Career 
A few classical commissions and USC student films aside, Beltrami scored his first feature in 1994, the thriller Death Match for director Joe Coppolletta, and reached a higher level of public acclaim in 1996 when he wrote the score for Wes Craven's smash hit shocker Scream. Since then, Beltrami has become firmly entrenched as a composer of choice for the horror/thriller and action genre, with the Scream sequels and hit films such as Mimic (1997), The Faculty (1998), Angel Eyes (2001), Joy Ride (2001), Resident Evil (2002), which he co-composed with Marilyn Manson, Blade II (2002), Hellboy (2004), I, Robot (2004) and Red Eye (2005) featuring prominently in his resume. Apart from horror/thriller and action, he also scores certain independent films such as The Dangerous Lives of Altar Boys and Tommy Lee Jones' The Three Burials of Melquiades Estrada. He was nominated for an Emmy Award for his score for the film David and Lisa in 1998, indicating a desire to spread his musical wings beyond the bounds of his genre pigeonholing.

He has composed the recent entries in the Die Hard saga, Live Free or Die Hard and A Good Day to Die Hard, taking over from Michael Kamen from whom Beltrami used some of the original themes from the previous three films due to Kamen's death in 2003. Beltrami earned an Academy Award nomination for his work on James Mangold's acclaimed 2007 western remake, 3:10 to Yuma.  Despite having met a mixed critical response, he was also nominated, alongside Buck Sanders, for the 2010 Academy Award for Best Original Score for his score to The Hurt Locker.  In 2011, he was met with critical praise and won a Satellite Award for Best Original Score for his score to the drama film Soul Surfer. Beltrami composed the soundtrack for Pierce Brosnan's 2014 spy film November Man. He co-composed the score for the 2015 Fantastic Four film with Philip Glass.

Beltrami's signature style is based around highly percussive texture. He often employs both traditional percussive instruments such as bass drums, as well as violins and brass instruments, forming layers of hits and stabs.

Collaborations
Beltrami has worked repeatedly with such directors as Wes Craven, James Mangold, Guillermo del Toro, Tommy Lee Jones, Alex Proyas, Len Wiseman, John Moore, Jonathan Levine, and John Krasinski. He has also worked with other musicians, including Marilyn Manson (for Resident Evil).

It was reported in October 2002 on Beltrami's official website that he had worked on orchestral arrangements for "Thyme", "The General" and "Elvis Presley and the Monster of Soul" (also known as "Leave Me Alone") from the then-unreleased Guns N' Roses album Chinese Democracy. While none of those tracks appear on the final track listing of the album, they were confirmed as being recorded during the sessions with a chance of release in the future. However, he was credited officially for providing arrangements on "Street of Dreams", "Madagascar", "There Was a Time", "This I Love" and "Prostitute". "Chinese Democracy" is also the name of a track on Beltrami's score for 3:10 to Yuma.

Credits

Film

Television

Video games

Actor

Awards and nominations

Industry awards

Academy Awards

Golden Globes

Primetime Emmy Awards

AACTA Award for Best Original Music Score
 2016: Gods of Egypt (nominated)
César Award for Best Original Music
 2009: Mesrine (nominated)Cinema Eye Honors Award for Outstanding Achievement in Original Music Score
 2019: Free Solo (nominated)
Fangoria Chainsaw Award for Best Score
 1998: Mimic (nominated)
 2002: Joy Ride (nominated)
 2005: Hellboy (nominated)
 2013: The Woman in Black (nominated)
Fright Meter Award for Best Score
 2012: The Woman in Black (nominated)
 2018: A Quiet Place (nominated)
Grand Bell Award for Best Music
 2013: Snowpiercer (nominated)
Hollywood Music in Media Award for Best Original Score
 2018: Free Solo (nominated)
 2019: Ford v. Ferrari (won)
Satellite Award for Best Original Score
 2011: Soul Surfer (won)
 2019: Ford v. Ferrari (nominated)

Critics awards

Critics' Choice Movie Award for Best Score
 2008: 3:10 to Yuma (nominated)
Denver Film Critics Society Award for Best Original Score
 2019: A Quiet Place (nominated)
Film Critics Circle of Australia Award for Best Music
 2017: Gods of Egypt (nominated)
Hawaii Film Critics Society Award for Best Original Score
 2019: A Quiet Place (nominated)
Houston Film Critics Society Award for Best Original Score
 2008: 3:10 to Yuma (nominated)

References

External links
 Personal website
 
 
 Biography at Movie Music UK
 Marco Beltrami interview at UnderScores : Musique de Film

1966 births
American film score composers
American male film score composers
American people of Greek descent
American people of Italian descent
Brown University alumni
La-La Land Records artists
Living people
USC Thornton School of Music alumni
Varèse Sarabande Records artists
Ward Melville High School alumni
Yale School of Music alumni